The first season of S.W.A.T. an American police procedural drama television series, premiered on CBS on November 2, 2017, and ended on May 17, 2018, with 22 episodes. It aired on Thursday at 10:00 p.m. The series is based on the 1975 television series of the same name created by Robert Hamner and developed by Rick Husky, and centers on Sergeant Daniel "Hondo" Harrelson and his Special Weapons And Tactics (S.W.A.T.) team operating in Los Angeles.

The series was announced in February 2017 with former Criminal Minds cast member Shemar Moore announced as the lead role. The series was officially ordered in May 2017.

S.W.A.T.s first season ranked as the 35th most watched for the 2017–18 United States network television schedule with a total of 9.13 million viewers.

Cast and characters

Main 
 Shemar Moore as Sergeant II Daniel "Hondo" Harrelson Jr.
 Stephanie Sigman as Captain Jessica Cortez
 Alex Russell as Officer III James "Jim" Street
 Lina Esco as Officer III Christina "Chris" Alonso
 Kenny Johnson as Officer III+1 Dominique Luca
 David Lim as Officer III Victor Tan
 Peter Onorati as Sergeant II Jeff Mumford
 Jay Harrington as Sergeant II David "Deacon" Kay

Recurring 
 Patrick St. Esprit as Commander Robert Hicks
 Bre Blair as Annie Kay
 Louis Ferreira as William "Buck" Spivey
 Lou Ferrigno Jr. as Donovan Rocker
 Peter Facinelli as Michael Plank
 Sherilyn Fenn as Karen Street
 Debbie Allen as Charice Harrelson
 Michael Beach as Leroy Henderson
 DeShae Frost as Darryl Henderson
 Cathy Cahlin Ryan as Dr. Wendy Hughes
 Lyndie Greenwood as Erika Rogers
 Otis "Odie" Gallop as Sergeant Stevens
 David Rees Snell as Detective John Burrows

Guest 
 Michael O'Neill as Carl Luca
 Brooke Nevin as Ally
 Gabrielle Dennis as Briana Harrelson
 MC Lyte as DEA Special Agent Katrina "K.C." Walsh
 Jason Wiles as Sgt. Vandelli
 Angelica Scarlet Johnson as Kelly Stewart
 Alex Carter as Hawkins
 Kelvin Han Yee as Jae Kim

Episodes

Production 
On February 3, 2017, it was announced that CBS had greenlit production of a pilot episode of a television series inspired by the 2003 film adaptation of the 1970s ABC series S.W.A.T.. The pilot was written by Aaron Rahsaan Thomas and Shawn Ryan and directed by Justin Lin.

The new series was ordered by CBS on May 12, 2017. Co-creator and executive producers Thomas and Ryan would serve as the showrunners. The series premiered on November 2, 2017. On November 17, 2017, CBS picked up the series for a full season of 20 episodes and on December 1, 2017, CBS ordered two additional episodes for the first season bringing the total to 22 episodes.

In February 2017, former Criminal Minds cast member Shemar Moore was announced as the Daniel "Hondo" Harrelson, alongside new co-stars Kenny Johnson as Dominic Luca, who was originally named Brian Gamble, and Lina Esco as Christina "Chris" Alonzo, who also originally named Sanchez. Several additional cast members were announced in March 2017. Jay Harrington plays Officer Deacon Kay, Alex Russell is James "Jim" Street, and finally, Peter Onorati was cast as Jeff Mumford, are four member of the S.W.A.T team of the Los Angeles Police Department in the original movie. On September 21, 2017, David Lim was cast in the role of Hondo's new co-member Victor Tan and was later promoted to series regular status for first season.

Reception

Ratings

Critical response
The review aggregation website Rotten Tomatoes reported a 48% approval rating for the first season, with an average rating of 4.59/10 based on 27 reviews. The website's critical consensus reads, "Despite a commanding, charming performance from Shemar Moore, S.W.A.T. remains a simple procedural overrun with clichés." Metacritic, which uses a weighted average, assigned a score of 45 out of 100 based on 12 reviews, indicating "mixed or average reviews".

Home media

References

External links

2017 American television seasons
2018 American television seasons